Stade Universitaire Saint-Léonard is a stadium in Fribourg, Switzerland, located next to Patinoire Saint-Léonard.  It is currently used for football matches and is the home ground of FC Fribourg. The capacity is 9,000, consisting of 1000 seats and 8,000 standing places.

References

Football venues in Switzerland
Fribourg
Buildings and structures in the canton of Fribourg
FC Fribourg